Zoop is a puzzle video game, similar to Plotting.

Zoop may also refer to:

Zoop (TV), a Dutch soap opera about eight teens involved in nature
Zoop (Iggy Arbuckle), a fictional character in the animated children's series Iggy Arbuckle
ZOOP, Titan Industries brand which sells children's watches

See also
Courreges ZOOOP, an electric car